Kevin Phelan (born 8 November 1990) is an Irish professional golfer who finished T62nd at the 2013 U.S. Open.

Phelan was born in Waterford, Ireland and grew up in St. Augustine, Florida. He played college golf at the University of North Florida. He turned professional in September 2013.

Phelan finished T-17 at the European Tour Qualifying School to earn his 2014 European Tour card, after playing in all three stages.

Results in major championships

Note: Phelan only played in the U.S. Open.

CUT = missed the half-way cut
"T" = tied

Team appearances
Amateur
Eisenhower Trophy (representing Ireland): 2010, 2012
St Andrews Trophy (representing Great Britain & Ireland): 2012
European Amateur Team Championship (representing Ireland): 2011, 2013
Palmer Cup (representing Europe): 2013
Walker Cup (representing Great Britain & Ireland): 2013

See also
2013 European Tour Qualifying School graduates

References

External links

North Florida Ospreys profile

Irish male golfers
European Tour golfers
University of North Florida alumni
People from Waterford (city)
People from St. Augustine, Florida
1990 births
Living people